Graziano Gasparini (31 July 1924 – 30 November 2019) was a Venezuelan architect, photographer, painter and historian,  sometimes referred to as Graciano Gasparini (ie using a Spanish version of his first name). 

Gasparini was born in Gorizia, on the Italian–Slovenian border, in 1924. After completing his education in Venice, he worked for Carlo Scarpa in connection with the Biennale. After a break caused by the Second World War, the famous exhibition resumed in 1948, and Gasparini first visited Venezuela that year while promoting it. He settled in Caracas and pursued a career as an architect.
He specialised in restoring Spanish Colonial architecture, while developing a parallel career as an architectural historian.  The buildings he worked on include the Bolivarian Museum in Caracas, which was inaugurated in 1960. Beginning with a survey of Spanish Colonial churches in Venezuela (Templos coloniales de Venezuela. Caracas, 1959), he published on a variety of topics related to Latin American architecture, including prehispanic and indigenous traditions.  Caracas a través de su arquitectura remains the only compendium on the history of architecture of Venezuela's capital.
His scholarship was recognised by the award of a Guggenheim Fellowship in 1987.

Personal life
Gasparini's first wife was the Venezuelan sociologist Olga Lagrange, who died in 1971.

Some of his publications were written jointly with his second wife, the american anthropologist Luise Margolies. He died in Caracas, aged 95

His brother Paolo Gasparini (1934, Gorizia, Italy) was trained as a photographer within the Italian neorealist current, at the beginning of the fifties. In 1955 he settled in Venezuela, where he began to dedicate himself professionally to architectural photography. At the same time, he works on street reporting using a realistic language that is influenced by photographers such as Paul Strand, William Klein or Robert Frank. For direct urban photography, Gasparini uses a 35mm camera, while he reserves the medium format for architecture. In his practice, sequences or series are essential, which constitute photographic essays in which images are juxtaposed and dialogue with each other. As a socially committed photographer, Gasparini has portrayed the cultural tensions and contradictions of all the Latin American countries. His images convey the harsh social reality faced by a region whose cultural authenticity is unquestionable and where local tradition dialogue with a clumsy imposed modernity. Gasparini publishes various projects in photobook format, which he combines  the making of photomurals and audiovisual projections. Between 1961 and 1965 he had the chance to record the daily events of the Cuban Revolution through being on the island. The ensuing photograph series was due to be published in France with the collaboration of Armand Gatti, but ultimately remained unpublished. The perfectly conserved mock-up of the project was donated to Museo Reina Sofía by Paolo Gasparini in 2015.

Bibliography
 Templos coloniales de Venezuela. Graziano Gasparini. 1959 
 Caracas a través de su Arquitectura. Graziano Gasparini and Juan Pedro Posani (1969)
 Inca Architecture. Graziano Gasparini and Luise Margolies. (English translation 1980)
 Las fortificaciones del período hispánico en Venezuela. Graziano Gasparini (1985)
 Arquitectura colonial iberoamericana. Graziano Gasparini, editor (1997)
 Arquitectura Indigena de Venezuela. Graziano Gasparini and Luise Margolies (2005).  An excerpt La Vivienda Colectiva de los Yanomami appears in "Tipití: Journal of the Society for the Anthropology of Lowland South America": Vol. 2: Iss. 2, Article 1.

References

External links
 interview Registro Nacional Voz de los Creadores. 2004.

1924 births
2019 deaths
Venezuelan architects
Italian emigrants to Venezuela
Academic staff of the Central University of Venezuela
Architectural historians
Preservationist architects